The 2020 season of Survivor: VIP is the tenth season overall of the Israeli reality program Survivor and the third VIP season. The season featured 18 celebrity contestants competing against each other for the 1 million NIS prize. The season was filmed in the Philippines between August and October 2019, and began airing on Reshet 13 on May 2, 2020.

Format changes
This season largely retained the format of previous seasons, with several changes:
Airing format: This season aired four to five episodes per three-day cycle, compared to the two episodes per cycle schedule of previous seasons.
Cabin Guard: Voted out players became Cabin Guards, who lived at the Negotiation Cabin (as seen in all seasons since the 2012 VIP season), where representatives from each tribe met to broker deals, such as allocating resources or picking contestants to switch tribes. If the deliberating contestants could not come to a conclusion in the allotted time, the Cabin Guard who had been there the longest would make the decision for them.
Duels: There were three types of duels involving the Cabin Guards, of which the first two were similar to the zombie's duels from season seven, Survivor: Honduras.
Vote duel: Immediately after each tribal immunity challenge, the losing tribe's Cabin Guard would challenge one of the tribe members to a duel. If the Cabin Guard won the duel, they voted in the duel loser's stead at the upcoming Tribal Council, and had the power to summon one member of the losing tribe to the Cabin to strategize for the vote. If the Cabin Guard lost the duel, they exited the game. After the merge, these duels occurred immediately before the immunity challenge. 
Cabin Guard duel: If the Cabin Guard won the vote duel, they duelled the player voted out at the next Tribal Council for the right to remain the Cabin Guard. At two predetermined points, winners of these duels returned to the game.
Reward duel: After the merge, one tribe member competed in a duel against the Cabin Guard. If the player won the duel, one of their tribemates received a video call from a loved one. If the Cabin Guard won two consecutive duels, they would immediately return to the game. These duels were held in lieu of the veto challenges seen in all seasons since the second season, Survivor: Pearl Islands.
Popularity ratings: Contestants regularly ranked their tribemates throughout the game. On the first day, players ranked the others; the nine most popular players formed the Kapre tribe, while the remaining nine formed the Anting Anting tribe. Before each reward challenge, players ranked their tribemates. Before the merge, the player from each tribe with the lowest rating was unable to enjoy the reward should their tribe win the challenge, and were unable to compete in the individual immunity challenge should their tribe lose the tribal immunity challenge. After the merge, the player with the lowest rating was unable to compete in the reward challenge.
Penalty vote: After the merge, the contestant who placed last in the immunity challenge received a penalty vote at that night's Tribal Council. This was similar to the veto challenge penalty votes from the 2012 VIP season.

Contestants

Season summary

Voting history

External links
  

Survivor (Israeli TV series)
2020 Israeli television seasons
Television shows filmed in the Philippines
Entertainment scandals